Mohammad Saleh Uddin, "Badal" (born 6 November 1954) is a Bangladeshi architect, professor, author and artist.

His books, published by McGraw-Hill and John Wiley & Sons are widely used as graphical communication and design textbooks internationally. Some have been translated from English into Spanish and into Chinese. He is also the main architect of the Gulshan Club scheduled to be built in Gulshan, Dhaka in 2011, having won the international open design competition for it.

Early life and education
Born in Comilla, he was the third child, the oldest of two sons to parents Shamsuddin Ahmed Munshi and Fatema Khatun. After matriculation from the Notre Dame College, he attended Bangladesh University of Engineering and Technology for a bachelor's degree in architecture. He graduated summa cum laude (first position among other graduates) in 1981. Then he joined as a lecturer at his alma mater, eventually leaving it to pursue graduate studies at Kent State University in Ohio, United States.

He graduated with a master's degree in urban design. Finally he went to University of Sheffield for a doctorate degree in computer representation from the School of Architecture. His PhD thesis was on Louis Kahn's design of the Bangladesh National Parliament Building.

Career
From 1988 to 1992, he was a professor of architecture at Savannah College of Art and Design. He was the former associate dean at Southern University from 1997 to 1999. Uddin was the graduate coordinator for the Department of Architectural Studies at the University of Missouri from 2000 to 2006. Later he founded the Department of Architecture at American International University – Bangladesh. Uddin has also been involved in green building initiatives.

In July 2002, Uddin built his 4,000 sq ft home as the general contractor and designer and finished eight months later. The resulting structure was called "one of Columbia's most unique creations" by   Columbia Home magazine.

Journal editor
He has served as the editor of the National Journal of the Design Communication Association.

Awards
Uddin has been described by BRAC University as an eminent architect. Among the awards he has received are:

 Honorable mention, American Institute of Architects (AIA) Missouri Design Awards 2005
 Innovator Award for Advancing Teaching with Technology Award 2004 University of Missouri
 Jurors' Award of Excellence, American Society of Architectural Perspectivists, 1996
 Teacher of the Year Award for Architecture (1994–1995) Southern University
 Tau Sigma Delta Honors for academic excellence Kent State University

Bibliography
Books

References

External links

 
 Mohammad Saleh Uddin at WorldCat
 M. Saleh Uddin Faculty page at American International University Bangladesh
 M. Saleh Uddin (Faculty page) at Southern Polytechnic State University

1956 births
Living people
Bangladeshi architects
Alumni of the University of Sheffield
Kent State University alumni
Savannah College of Art and Design faculty
University of Missouri faculty
Bangladesh University of Engineering and Technology alumni
Academic staff of the American International University-Bangladesh